Johnron Ramos Macapagal (born April 27, 1998), also known as Ron Macapagal or Bidaman Ron, is a Filipino actor and singer. He became well known as a top 6 grand finalist of BidaMan , a search for the next leading man and a segment of ABS-CBN noontime show, “It’s Showtime.”  He has appeared in several TV dramas and films. In late 2020, he signed with PolyEast Records to release his debut single “Bakit Di Pagbigyan”.

Discography

Filmography

Television

Film

Awards and nominations

References

External links 

 

1998 births
Living people
21st-century Filipino male singers
21st-century Filipino male actors
PolyEast Records artists